Belfast East may refer to:

The eastern part of Belfast.
Belfast East (UK Parliament constituency)
Belfast East (Assembly constituency)
Belfast East (Northern Ireland Parliament constituency)
East Belfast F.C.
East Belfast GAA
East Belfast Observer